The Birds of Prey is a superhero team featured in several American comic book series, miniseries, and special editions published by DC Comics since 1996. The book's premise originated as a partnership between Black Canary and Barbara Gordon, who had adopted the codename Oracle at the time, but has expanded to include additional superheroines. The team name "Birds of Prey" was attributed to DC assistant editor Frank Pittarese in the text page of the first issue. The group is initially based in Gotham City and later operates in Metropolis and then relocates once more to "Platinum Flats", California, a new locale introduced in Birds of Prey in 2008.

The series was conceived by Jordan B. Gorfinkel and originally written by Chuck Dixon. Gail Simone scripted the comic from issue #56 to #108. Sean McKeever was originally to replace Simone, but McKeever subsequently decided to leave the project and only wrote issues #113–117; Tony Bedard, who wrote issues #109–112, briefly took over the title at issue #118. Artists have included Butch Guice, Greg Land, Ed Benes and Joe Bennett; Nicola Scott began a stint as artist with issue #100. In 2011, the title was relaunched under writer Duane Swierczynski and artist Jesus Saiz. With the 2016 company-wide soft relaunch DC Rebirth, the Birds of Prey are re-introduced in the new title Batgirl and the Birds of Prey, featuring a team consisting of Batgirl, Black Canary and Huntress.

Despite the title of the series being Birds of Prey, the phrase was not mentioned in the book until issue #86, when one of the group's members, Zinda Blake, suggests that it might be a fitting name for the team, but other characters get sidetracked and do not respond to her suggestion. Oracle, the team's leader, refers to the group by that name in a conversation with the new Blue Beetle, Jaime Reyes, and later within the series.

The core of the team is made up of Oracle and Black Canary, with other heroines forming a rotating roster sometimes for extended periods, sometimes for merely one adventure. After Black Canary's departure, Huntress remained as the staple member and field leader, alongside new "core members". Following the events of Flashpoint (2011) and the company-wide relaunch as part of The New 52, Oracle recovers her mobility and reclaims her former Batgirl identity, taking a brief hiatus from the team in the process. Despite the previously all-female central roster, male allies such as Nightwing, Wildcat, Savant and Creote frequently assist missions. In addition, Hawk and Dove briefly joined the team, making Hawk its first male member.

Publication history

One-shots and initial series by Chuck Dixon
The title series began with Chuck Dixon's one shot Black Canary/Oracle: Birds of Prey (cover date 1996 / published December 1995). Initially, the two heroines featured were Barbara Gordon (formerly "Batgirl") and Dinah Lance (currently "Black Canary"). From the beginning, Canary was written as passionate and idealistic. In an interview with Comics Bulletin, Dixon described this choice as a fertile clash of values: "Dinah's more idealistic approach is at the heart of this book".

Gail Simone era
When Gail Simone took over the series in 2003, she added the Huntress to the lineup. In her first arc, entitled "Of Like Minds", Simone let Black Canary walk into a trap set by Brian Durlin, known as Savant, and his assistant Creote. With Black Canary now critically injured and chained, Savant begins listing demands, the most significant of which is the true identity of Batman. In the end, Huntress and Canary defeat their enemies, and form a team.

Author Simone commented on the new lineup, saying that each character provided a foil for the two others: "In this case, Babs and Dinah respect each other tremendously, and each is capable of great things the other is not. Dinah's not just Oracle's legs, sometimes, she's her conscience, or her muse, or just her best friend. And Oracle is far more to Dinah than just the mission controller. They trust each other, and out of that, there's a friendship that they believe in. Huntress...I see Helena as someone who is not a loner completely by choice. Dinah is so accepting and so open that Helena sees an opportunity to be part of something without having to force her way in. There's friction, because once Helena puts the mask on, she's really not very good fitting in. But she likes that they're giving her a chance. Whether she blows it or not, you'll have to keep reading".

Simone was appreciative of her work, saying Birds of Prey editor Lysa Hawkins "was looking for a slightly tougher Birds of Prey and asked me to submit a proposal. I have a huge fondness for Babs and Dinah both, so it's a bit of a dream come true. I'm really excited by the art, which is very sleek and sexy, with a nice dark tone, by Supergirl star Ed Benes".

The Huntress later meets Oracle in person for the first time while rescuing her from a potentially life threatening situation during the "Sensei & Student" storyline. The US government had become aware of the existence of Oracle and formatted a list of suspects to interrogate, one of whom was Barbara. Without any form of due process, two federal agents imply they believe she is the Oracle and that if any evidence is brought to light she will be tried for treason against the United States of America. Once again, Oracle relies on the Huntress when no other allies are available.

While Oracle and Huntress share a long history of animosity with one another, Black Canary eventually persuades Oracle to employ Huntress as a full-time agent. The budding friendship is cut short during the "Hero Hunters" arc. In the final issue of the storyline, the Huntress realizes Oracle has been manipulating her psychologically in order to make her "behave" properly, in the same way a teacher attempts to reform a troubled child. Despite Oracle's remorse for her actions, Huntress temporarily departs from the group. She later rejoins the team, once again as a full-time agent along with newcomer Lady Blackhawk. Although the personnel on Oracle's team grows and changes, Huntress and Lady Blackhawk remain core agents.

As Birds of Prey approached its hundredth issue, Simone used issues #99 and #100 to shake up the lineup. She let Black Canary leave the team with her ward, a little girl called "Sin", and used a prison break arc to introduce superhumanly strong Big Barda, pacifist Judomaster and rascally Misfit into the new squad, and with the new Spy Smasher as an ambiguous Jack Bauer-like anti-heroine and Lois Lane cornering Oracle into almost giving away her secret identity. Again, the characters were chosen to provide a foil for each other, and affirmed her love for her characters: "The team is a group of individuals, quite unlike the friendship between Dinah, Helena and Babs. And any team with Barda on it automatically has a certain bull in a China shop tremble, and I love that... The characters don't apologize for being asskickers, nor for being smart, nor for being sexy, nor for being sexual, for that matter. There are always going to be some people who find that not to their taste, but at the same time, Birds of Prey regularly brings in people who don't otherwise read mainstream comics, a whole audience that may not pick up any other superhero titles, and I love that niche, that little area between good taste and utter shamelessness". Finally, Simone stated her agony of leaving the book: "I miss the characters in all the books I've worked on. Writing the last issue of Birds of Prey I'm doing was actually physically painful".

Cancellation
After Simone's departure to sister title Wonder Woman, Sean McKeever wrote Birds of Prey from issues #113 to #117. McKeever used his short stint to pit a new incarnation of "Blackhawk" villain Killer Shark against ex-Blackhawk Zinda Blake and to introduce the location of Platinum Flats, called by IGN "the Silicon Valley of the DC universe and a hotbed of white-collar crime committed by mysterious villain 'The Visionary'". IGN called his short stint "enjoyable and creative". His writing deeds were taken over by Tony Bedard, who stated in a Comic Book Resources interview that he liked the concept of Platinum Flats. Bedard wanted to mix the concept of 21st century white collar crime with 1930s mob families and said that Oracle is his favorite Birds of Prey character.

DC canceled the series in February 2009, with the Oracle: The Cure mini-series beginning publication the following month as part of a company-wide reorganization of Batman-related titles.

Relaunch
Birds of Prey returned under the Brightest Day banner in 2010. Gail Simone returned to write series with Ed Benes providing the artwork. Hawk and Dove were brought as new members of the team as well, with Oracle playing a strictly supporting role. While in Singapore in December the same year, she announced, in an interview with the newspaper Straits Times, an intention to create a Singaporean superheroine.

The title was eventually cancelled along with every other DC book as part of a company-wide relaunch following the Flashpoint event. Two months prior to the title's cancellation, Simone left the book after issue #13.

In July, writer Marc Andreyko and artist Billy Tucci took over the title for the final story-arc, which featured the original Black Canary and Phantom Lady. Manhunter, a former Birds of Prey member created by Andreyko, appeared as well.

Rebooted universe

DC Comics relaunched Birds of Prey with issue #1 in September 2011 for The New 52 relaunch with the new series having some similar characters which existed in a different universe than the previous DC titles. Novelist Duane Swierczynski replaced Andreyko as the writer, with Jesus Saiz handling the art. Noted Batman villain Poison Ivy was one of the new characters joining the team.

The book's first storyline begins shortly after Barbara regains the use of her legs after the events of Flashpoint. However, she still has been paralyzed by the Joker, but thanks to a new kind of implant, she can walk again. She has to deal with some PTSD, though. Dinah approaches her old friend with an offer to join the new Birds of Prey team she is putting together, but she declines, instead suggesting that Katana take her place. The gun-toting vigilante Starling is also recruited into the team, along with Poison Ivy.

Following the departure of Poison Ivy after issue #12, the team roster changed again when Katana spun off into her own solo book along with providing her services to the Justice League of America. With occasional help from Condor and a former Talon (an assassin of the Court of Owls), named Mary Turner, a young African-American woman who became mute after being injured by a Japanese Fu-Go balloon bomb attack when she was a little girl whilst the rest of her family was killed from the bombing during World War II and was recruited into the Court. In Batgirl Annual #1, Catwoman freed Mary from Blackgate Penitentiary, and Batgirl chose her to replace Katana after she left. The Birds of Prey gave her the codename Strix (Latin for Owl). The Birds of Prey moved on with writer Christy Marx in issue #18.

Batgirl and the Birds of Prey

DC Comics reconfigured the continuity of their shared universe again in 2016 with DC Rebirth. The Birds of Prey had their own title once again, now called Batgirl and the Birds of Prey. Huntress is aware of Batgirl and Black Canary's secret identities, but they do not seem to be aware of hers. The three women form an uneasy alliance in order to take down mutual foes. Batgirl and Black Canary are attempting to find yet another villain who is using the name "Oracle". Issue #4 is essentially Huntress's origin story, showing why she is waging war against certain mob families.

Membership

Main characters
Oracle/Batgirl (Barbara Gordon) Barbara is the leader of the Birds of Prey. The former Batgirl and daughter of Batman's closest ally James Gordon, she was paralyzed from the waist down as a result of an ambush by the Joker in her apartment and reinvented herself as Oracle with the Suicide Squad. She possesses an information network, a photographic memory, and extreme hacking and programming skills. Barbara is also a skilled hand-to-hand fighter and a master in weaponry, though she is rarely shown in a physical fight; she usually directs the team remotely. After the events of Flashpoint, Barbara regained the use of her legs and returned to the Batgirl identity, taking a temporary hiatus from the team in the process. She realises the world needs her to be Oracle again during Joker War. 
Black Canary (Dinah Laurel Lance) A tough but good-natured and idealistic streetfighter who is the Birds of Prey's star martial artist. Barbara and Dinah are close friends, Barbara having helped Dinah through low periods in Dinah's life. In addition to her superpower, an ultrasonic attack known as the "Canary Cry", she is also a highly skilled martial artist. She departed the team in issue #99, and returned in issue #1 of volume 2.
Huntress (Helena Bertinelli) A vigilante. Prone to use of excessive force, Bertinelli is a former mafia princess who was devastated at a young age when her family was killed in a mob hit. Trained by her assassin cousin in the art of violence, she declared war on the mob in the name of justice. Following Black Canary's departure, Huntress became the team's field commander. She was also the second crimefighter to go by the name Batgirl.
Lady Blackhawk (Zinda Blake) A time-displaced 1940s character, Zinda served as the team's aviatrix and pilot of the Aerie One and Two. She is an expert sharpshooter and highly trained with various types of firearms.

Recurring characters
Big Barda (Barda Free) A New God from the planet Apokolips and former member of the Female Furies and later member of the Justice League. Her husband is Justice League International member Mister Miracle (Scott Free). The character was killed off in Death of the New Gods, and officially recognized within this series in Birds of Prey #112. She was later revived at the end of DC's Final Crisis crossover.
Black Alice (Lori Zechlin) A magically powered anti-heroine who can temporarily borrow the powers of other magic users. It is suggested in a Final Crisis tie-in issue that she could be a blood relative to Gail Simone's other creation, Misfit.
Blue Beetle (Ted Kord) A former Justice Leaguer with a crush on Barbara. Kord is murdered in Countdown to Infinite Crisis, and the main characters visit his grave in Valhalla Cemetery in Birds of Prey #96.
Catwoman (Selina Kyle) A feline-styled anti-heroine, Selina has cooperated with the team on several operations, the most notable of which was a starring role in the Birds of Prey: Manhunt mini-series.
Cassandra Cain The daughter of assassin David Cain and Lady Shiva, In pre-Flashpoint DC continuity, Cain was the third crimefighter to call herself "Batgirl".
Cheshire An expert martial artist and toxicologist, Jade Nguyen is a recurring foe for the Birds of Prey. She is hired by Kobra to retrieve an ancient relic in Minnesota, where she runs into conflict with Black Canary and the relic accidentally transports Jade into the past. Later, when Black Canary finds herself lost in the past looking for Jade, both work together and successfully return to the present. Later in China, Black Canary and Cheshire work together once more to pursue Senator Bob Pullman, who had framed Jade for the murder of Dinah's sensei. It would later be revealed that Senator Pullman had abused Jade's mother.
Condor (Benjamin Reyes) A male vigilante who opposed the Birds of Prey before joining the team in a 2012 story. A former National Security Agency analyst, Benjamin Reyes later manifested telekinetic abilities, which he learned to use to control a set of mechanical wings, through which he operated as the independent vigilante Condor.
Creote A former KGB agent, Creote is a devoted servant and only friend to Savant; in his earliest appearances, his devoted love for his master was a secret. In a 2010 storyline however, Barbara outed Creote and his feelings to Savant, and the two subsequently became an item.
Dove (Dawn Granger) A strong-willed but calm young woman, and the avatar of peace. A former member of the Teen Titans, Dove was granted superhuman strength, durability, and reflexes by the Lords of Chaos and Order, and used them to fight alongside Hank Hall. Following the events of the Blackest Night crossover, Dawn was invited to join the Birds.
Gypsy (Cindy Reynolds) Once a member of Justice League Detroit, Gypsy debuts as an agent for Oracle at the end of Birds of Prey #92. She is a metahuman whose powers include creating illusions, camouflaging herself and others near her to blend into any background.
Hawk (Hank Hall) A violent and conservative young man, and the physical avatar of war. Granted superhuman abilities by the Lords of Chaos and Order, Hawk fought crime alongside his brother Don and later Dawn, before being driven insane by the wizard Mordru and becoming the villain known as Extant. After his murder at the hands of Atom Smasher, Hank was resurrected during the events of Blackest Night. During the Brightest Day follow-up crossover, he was offered an invitation to join the team.
Hawkgirl (Kendra Saunders) Oracle first solicits her assistance in issue #104 in dealing with the Secret Six, for which Oracle rewards her with a car. Throughout the Russian arc, Hawkgirl serves as a team member and develops a rivalry with Secret Six member Scandal.
Ice (Tora Olafsdotter) A Nordic metahuman with ice-related abilities and a former Justice League International member, who was believed dead until discovered by the team in Russia.
Infinity A new character who appeared towards near the end of Volume One, Infinity debuted in Birds of Prey #120, and was described by Oracle as a "new operative" in #121, though it is implied she may have worked for Oracle in the past as well. Infinity has the ability to make her body intangible, but little else is known about her. In issue #125, Infinity reveals to Huntress that she can read the residual memory of a corpse as long as its brain is intact, and that she has to make physical contact for that power to operate. Huntress asked where her phasing ability originated, and was told it was due to a curse.
Jade Canary (Sandra Wu-San) The assassin more commonly known as Lady Shiva took Dinah's spot on the Birds of Prey team as of "One Year Later", calling herself the Jade Canary. After the conditions behind the switch she arranged with the Black Canary were met, she left the team. In a final act, she acquired a new apprentice to train in the form of Bethany Thorne, Crime Doctor's daughter.
Josh A rental car agent who bargained with Huntress for information in exchange for a date. After reluctantly agreeing and (surprisingly) sleeping with him, Huntress has used Josh as an agent in some of her easier tasks against the mob.
Judomaster (Sonia Sato) In issue #100, a new female Judomaster joins the Birds of Prey after being invited by Oracle. This character would be expanded on by later writers, starting with Geoff Johns' exploration of her in Justice Society of America.
Katana (Tatsu Yamashiro) A skilled swordswoman and martial artist from Japan, who wields an enchanted blade known as "Soultaker". She first assisted the team in rescuing Oracle from Senator Pullman, after which Oracle gave her a card and the promise of a favor if ever required. After Oracle returned to the Batgirl identity, she suggested Katana as a full-time recruit.
Manhunter (Kate Spencer) In issue #100, Manhunter joins the Birds of Prey after being invited by Oracle, following Canary's resignation. She has stayed on as a core member. Kate Spencer is a vigilante of a more violent sort than her teammates. In her civilian identity, she is a federal prosecutor who became sickened to see criminals escape punishment via the judicial system. Using stolen weapons, Manhunter elects to hunt down and if necessary kill supervillains herself.
Misfit (Charlotte Gage-Radcliffe) A teenage orphan with teleportation powers, her persistent appearances (first as a wannabe Batgirl and then as Misfit) are initially a nuisance to Oracle, although Barbara's attitude gradually softens. After Barbara discovers her homelessness and personal tragedy, she formally invites her to become a member of the Birds. As of Birds of Prey vol. 2, #1, she is no longer a member of the team and now lives with a foster family.
Nightwing (Dick Grayson) A dashing crimefighter and the original Robin, Dick enjoyed a mutual teenage crush on Barbara that once blossomed into a steamy romance, but has crumbled despite continued strong feelings on both sides. Recently, Barbara and Dick reconciled. As they did, Dick dropped to one knee and proposed; a tearful Barbara said, "Yes". As of "One Year Later", the engagement has been mutually put on hold.
Poison Ivy (Dr. Pamela Isley, Ph.D.) A noted eco-terrorist and enemy of Batman. She was recruited to the team by Black Canary early in the series' New 52 run, a decision that did not sit well with the other members. She possesses powerful pheromones that make people susceptible to mind control, as well as the ability to conjure sentient plants that can attack and restrain enemies. Eventually, it was revealed that she only joined the group in order to manipulate them into fulfilling her own dark agenda, and she left upon being exposed and defeated by the other members.
Power Girl (Karen Starr/Kara Zor-L) Power Girl was Oracle's first operative, before she took in Black Canary. This first partnership was doomed, since Power Girl was unable to save a shipload of people. She has worked occasionally with Oracle in subsequent episodes but the two have a very poor relationship; she was invited to return to the team in issue #100, but stated she would do so "when Hell freezes over", despite begrudgingly appearing before and since to assist Oracle. The animosity between them is the opposite of the traditional Batgirl/Supergirl friendship.
Savant (Brian Durlin) The spoiled heir to an enormous fortune, Savant moved to Gotham to become a self-styled vigilante. After kidnapping and brutally torturing Black Canary, he was defeated by the Birds. Oracle made the questionable decision to rehabilitate him, mainly in order to keep his data files on hundreds of real villains. As his name would suggest, he is a genius, but due to a chemical imbalance he exhibits a non-linear memory. Savant has also exhibited feelings for Oracle, probably rooted in his envy of her computer skills. Later, however, he is shown to reciprocate Creote's romantic feelings for him as well.
The Secret Six Following their initial appearance, members of the Secret Six have appeared repeatedly in Birds of Prey. The team composed of Catman, Deadshot, Rag Doll, Scandal Savage, Knockout, and Harley Quinn act as foils to the Birds on one shared mission. Catman and Huntress are potential romantic interests, Scandal finds an enemy in Hawkgirl, and Barda and Knockout have a longstanding rivalry.
Strix (Mary Turner) Originally known as Mary Turner, Strix is a former Talon—a member of the Court of Owls, a clandestine order of reanimated assassins based in Gotham City—who first appeared in the Batgirl series. Deadly, mute, and endearing, Strix replaced Batgirl on the team at Batgirl's direction in a 2012 story.
Spy Smasher (Katarina Armstrong) An old college rival of Oracle's, Spy Smasher boasts a significant number of government and intelligence connections which she uses to manipulate Barbara. Trying to usurp Oracle's team, the two come to confrontation over the status of the Birds of Prey. She is also an expert sharpshooter.
Starling (Ev Crawford) A spirited, gun-toting vigilante introduced at the start of volume 2, following DC's 2011 reboot. Not much is known about her backstory, other than that she is a close friend of Black Canary and the first recruit added to the new team. She later betrayed the team to Mr. Freeze.
Vixen (Mari Jiwe McCabe) An international supermodel and former Justice League and Suicide Squad member, Mari was born in Africa. She inherited her family's "Tantu" totem, a necklace granting the wearer the ability to channel the skills/abilities of any animal. Vixen has been a field agent for Oracle, accompanying Huntress to the Pacific Northwest to stop a metahuman-worshipping cult.
Wildcat (Ted Grant) A former professional boxer and current member of the Justice Society, Ted serves as a mentor to Dinah and has helped her on several missions.

Collected editions
The series has been collected into a number of trade paperbacks published by DC Comics.

 Issues #22–26, #28–38, #42, #44–46 and #50–55 of volume 1 have yet to be collected into volumes.

In other media

Television
 The Birds of Prey appear in a self-titled TV series, consisting of Helena Kyle / Huntress (portrayed by Ashley Scott), Barbara Gordon / Oracle (portrayed by Dina Meyer), and Dinah Redmond (portrayed by Rachel Skarsten).
 Writer Gail Simone scripted the Justice League Unlimited episode "Double Date" with the intention of featuring a temporarily house-bound Barbara Gordon / Batgirl contacting the Huntress and Black Canary to complete a case for her. However, a character rights issue necessitated Gordon's removal and Huntress and Black Canary instead working with the Question and Green Arrow respectively.
 The Birds of Prey appear in the Batman: The Brave and the Bold episode "The Mask of Matches Malone!", consisting of the Huntress, Black Canary, and Catwoman, who join forces to rescue Batman after he suffers amnesia while working undercover as Matches Malone. The episode, which was written by Gail Simone and contains a musical number written by Michael Jenric, garnered controversy in online forums after airing in Australia due to the song's perceived racy and innuendo-laden lyrics. As a result, the episode's U.S. airing was delayed so that it could re-edited to meet American Standards and Practices. Executive producer James Tucker described the number as a "Cole Porter-type song... fun, sophisticated and with clever wordplay" and stated that ultimately, he was pleased with the edit.
 The Birds of Prey TV series incarnations of Helena Kyle and Barbara Gordon make cameo appearances in "Crisis on Infinite Earths", portrayed again by Ashley Scott while Dina Meyer provides uncredited vocals.

Film

A Birds of Prey film set in the DC Extended Universe (DCEU) was released on February 7, 2020. The film was directed by Cathy Yan, written by Christina Hodson, and features Margot Robbie reprising her role as Harley Quinn from preceding DCEU film Suicide Squad and co-producing the film. Robbie is joined by Jurnee Smollett-Bell, Mary Elizabeth Winstead, Rosie Perez and Ella Jay Basco as Dinah Lance, Helena Bertinelli / Huntress, Renee Montoya, and Cassandra Cain, respectively. By the end of the film, Lance, Bertinelli, and Montoya part ways with Quinn and Cain and form the titular Birds of Prey.

References

External links

DC page: Birds of Prey, Birds of Prey origin, BOP1999, BOP2010, BOP2011
Canary Noir (Birds of Prey fansite)
Cosmic Teams entry
Birds of Prey Retrospective at Newsarama

Comics characters introduced in 1996
2010 comics debuts
 
Black Canary
Batgirl
Characters created by Chuck Dixon
Characters created by Jordan B. Gorfinkel
Comics by Gail Simone
DC Comics female superheroes